This is a list of maximum recorded animal lifespans in captivity. Only animals from the classes of the Chordata phylum are included. On average, captive animals (especially mammals) live longer than wild animals. This may be due to the fact that zoos provide refuge against diseases, intraspecific competitions and predation. Most notably, animals with shorter lifespans and faster growth rates benefit more from zoos than animals with higher longevities and slow growth rates.

See also 

List of longest-living organisms
Longevity
Life expectancy

References

External links 
https://genomics.senescence.info/species/index.html

Longevity
Oldest animals
Oldest organisms